"Too Much Love Will Kill You" is a song written by British guitarist Brian May of Queen, Frank Musker and Elizabeth Lamers. The song reflected the breakdown of May's first marriage and attraction to his future wife, Anita Dobson. It was first recorded by Queen around 1988 or before, and was intended to be on the band's The Miracle album in 1989, but did not make the cut due to legal disputes following the band's decision that all songs on the album would be written by the group as opposed to individuals.

After Freddie Mercury's death in 1991, May arranged a solo version, which he performed at the Freddie Mercury Tribute Concert in 1992, and subsequently included on his solo album Back to the Light that same year. When released as a single, it reached number five on the UK Singles Chart, number two in Belgium, and topped the charts in the Netherlands. Because it was first played publicly at the Freddie Mercury Tribute Concert, a common misconception is that it was written as a tribute to Freddie Mercury, although it had actually been written several years before he died, and he sang lead vocal on the Queen version.

A version of this song recorded in 1989, with Mercury on vocals, was included on the band's 1995 album Made in Heaven. Released as a single in 1996, this version was less successful than May's version in Europe but did allow the song to chart in North America for the first time. In 1999, it was included in Queen's compilation album Greatest Hits III.

Track listings
 7-inch and cassette single
A. "Too Much Love Will Kill You" – 4:29
B. "I'm Scared" – 4:00

 UK CD single
 "Too Much Love Will Kill You"
 "I'm Scared"
 "Too Much Love Will Kill You" (guitar version)
 "Driven by You" (new version)

Personnel

Brian May – lead and backing vocals, piano, keyboard, acoustic and electric guitar

Charts

Weekly charts

Year-end charts

Certifications

Queen version

In 1995, the remaining members of Queen elected to include the original recording of "Too Much Love Will Kill You", with Mercury on vocals, on the Made in Heaven album, released four years after Mercury's death. Queen's version reached number 15 on the UK Singles Chart and number 19 on Canada's RPM Top Singles chart.

Although it failed to duplicate the chart success of May's solo version, Queen's version of the song has since come to be regarded as the definitive version, after being awarded "Best Song Musically and Lyrically" at the 1996 Novello Awards (May said later that if there was one song that he would have wanted to win an award for, it was this one), and being included on Queen's Greatest Hits III.

Critical reception
Steve Baltin from Cash Box wrote, "One of the last remnants of the late, great Freddie Mercury, the first single from the band’s new Made In Heaven album is vintage Mercury. After the wimpy opening that could’ve come from Styx or Chicago, Mercury’s grandiose vocals kick in, eclipsing the lame melody. Hearing Mercury again, especially in such fine form vocally, is a surprisingly touching experience."

Track listings
 7-inch single
A1. "Too Much Love Will Kill You" – 4:20
B1. "We Will Rock You" – 2:00
B2. "We Are the Champions" – 3:00

 CD single
 "Too Much Love Will Kill You" – 4:20
 "Spread Your Wings" – 4:32
 "We Will Rock You" – 2:00
 "We Are the Champions" – 3:00 

 US single
A. "Too Much Love Will Kill You" – 4:20
B. "Rock in Rio Blues" (live in Rio, January 1985) – 4:29

Personnel

 Freddie Mercury – lead vocals
 Brian May – electric guitar, piano, backing vocals
 Roger Taylor – drums, backing vocals
 John Deacon – bass guitar
 David Richards – keyboards, keyboard programming

Charts

Certifications

Music videos
The video for the Brian May version of the song was directed by David Mallet and features May singing the song to the camera, and is intercut with footage from various home movies. The video for the Queen version of the song was directed by DoRo and is a montage-style video of clips mainly from live performances and promo videos, and uses the Promo Edit version of the song.

Other versions
In 2003, May and Luciano Pavarotti performed a rendition of "Too Much Love Will Kill You", at the tenor's benefit concert held in Modena, Italy.

References

External links
 Official YouTube videos of Queen version: music video based on short film "Heart-Ache", at Freddie Mercury Tribute Concert
 Lyrics at Queen official website

1988 songs
1992 singles
1996 singles
Brian May songs
Dutch Top 40 number-one singles
Hollywood Records singles
Music videos directed by David Mallet (director)
Queen (band) songs
Songs released posthumously
Songs written by Brian May
Songs written by Frank Musker